Club Deportivo y Cultural Pichincha de Potosí is a Bolivian professional basketball team. It is the basketball team of the Colegio Nacional Pichincha university.

The team won the Libobasquet championship twice, in 2019 and 2022. According to the Bolivian newspaper Los Tiempos, several factors have contributed to the team’s success, including good management, economic and governmental support, and mainly the support of the people.
As it is with the other Potosi competitors, namely Calero and Nacional, many of the former students of the clubs' prestigious schools today contribute financially, in addition to attending the games. 

The Government of Potosí invested in the improvement of the Ciudad de Potosí coliseum, mainly with the installation of the floating floor, new giraffes for the boards and electronic meters.
 
Games between Pichincha and Calero normally draw around 5,000 spectators.

Honours 
Libobasquet

 Champions (2): 2019, 2022

Notable players
- Set a club record or won an individual award as a professional player.
- Played at least one official international match for his senior national team at any time.
  Ronald Arze
  Rene Calvo
  Lucas Tischer
  Andrew Jones

References

External links
Latinbasket.com profile

Basketball teams in Bolivia
Potosí
Basketball teams established in 1937